A dowager is a widow or widower who holds a title or property—a "dower"—derived from her or his deceased spouse. As an adjective, dowager usually appears in association with monarchical and aristocratic titles.

In popular usage, the noun dowager may refer to any elderly widow, especially one of wealth and dignity or autocratic manner.

Some dowagers move to a separate residence known as a dower house.

Use

In the United Kingdom

In the United Kingdom the widow of a peer or baronet may continue to use the style she had during her husband's lifetime, e.g. "Countess of Loamshire", provided that his successor, if any, has no wife to bear the plain title. Otherwise she more properly prefixes either her forename or the word Dowager, e.g. "Jane, Countess of Loamshire" or "Dowager Countess of Loamshire". (In any case, she would continue to be called "Lady Loamshire".)

The term queen dowager is used in the United Kingdom and several other countries for the widow of a king; when the dowager is the mother of the current monarch she is more often known as the queen mother.

In Asia 
Empress dowager is the title given to the mother or widow of a Chinese, Japanese, Korean or Vietnamese emperor. A notable example is Chinese Empress Dowager Cixi, who effectively ruled China for over 47 years.

In other regions
This form of address is used for noble ladies whose husbands have died. It was used for the late Queen Dowager, Fabiola of Belgium. 

Queen Victoria Eugenia of Spain was known as a dowager queen after the death of her husband.

Informal
Elderly widows of wealth, prominence, and dignified or autocratic manner are often referred to informally as dowagers. 

Dowagers portrayed in literature include Lady Bracknell in Oscar Wilde's The Importance of Being Earnest.

Maggie Smith portrayed Violet Crawley, Dowager Countess of Grantham from 2010 to 2015 in the television series Downton Abbey, and in the 2019 movie sequel Downton Abbey and the 2022 film Downton Abbey: A New Era.

References

External links

Noble titles
Widowhood